Law & Order: Special Victims Unit, the first spin-off of Law & Order, is an American police procedural television series that focuses on crimes of sexual nature. While the victim is often murdered, this is not always the case, and victims often play prominent roles in episodes. The series frequently uses stories that are "ripped from the headlines" or based on real crimes. Such episodes take a real crime and fictionalize it by changing the details. The series premiered on NBC on September 20, 1999, and its twenty-third season premiered on September 23, 2021.

Most episode titles of Law & Order: Special Victims Unit between seasons one and twelve are a single word or initialism. From seasons 13-17 and from seasons 21-23 (except for two episodes from season 23), the pattern changes to one in which episodes have a title with the number of letters matching the season number (in exactly two words, seasons 13–17). From seasons 18-20, and season 24 onwards, the episode titles follow no fixed pattern.

Series overview

Episodes

Seasons 1–19 (1999–2018)

Season 20 (2018–19)

 Philip Winchester departs the cast in the season finale, "End Game".
 Michael S. Chernuchin leaves the show as executive producer at the end of the season.

Season 21 (2019–2020)

 Warren Leight returns and takes over as executive producer once again.
 Jamie Gray Hyder joins as a recurring guest for the first seven episodes portraying Officer Katriona "Kat" Tamin. She is promoted to the main cast in the eighth episode.
 Demore Barnes had a continuous arc as Deputy Chief Christian Garland starting with "Down Low in Hell's Kitchen".
 Production on the twenty-first season of Law & Order: Special Victims Unit was halted sometime in early-mid March 2020, with 20/24 episodes finished. Making an earlier finale.

Season 22 (2020–21)

 Demore Barnes joins the main cast as Deputy Chief Christian Garland.
Filming for the season started on Monday, September 14, 2020. 
 Christopher Meloni (Det. Elliot Stabler) returns as a special guest star in the episode "Return of the Prodigal Son," making this his first appearance on the show after his exit in the season 12 finale ("Smoked").

Season 23 (2021–22) 

 This was the last season to feature Jamie Gray Hyder & Demore Barnes as regulars.
 Octavio Pisano joins the main cast.
 Chris Meloni, Danielle Mone Truitt and Ainsley Seiger have over arching appearances in a recurring capacity (Law & Order: OC crossovers).
 Warren Leight leaves the show as executive producer at the end of the season for the second time.

Season 24 (2022–23)

Molly Burnett joins in a recurring capacity in episodes 2–6, portraying Detective Grace Muncy. She is promoted to the main cast in the seventh episode.
David Graziano joins the crew as showrunner.
Kelli Giddish (Det. Amanda Rollins) departed the series in the ninth episode, "And a Trauma in a Pear Tree".

Home video releases

References

External links
Episodes at the official site of Law & Order: Special Victims Unit
The NBC Law & Order SVU Production Blog
Episodes at The Futon Critic
Episodes on TVGuide.com
Law & Order: Special Victims Unit DVD releases at TVShowsOnDVD.com

 
Lists of American crime drama television series episodes
Law & Order: Special Victims Unit seasons